Chvojnica may refer to several places in the Trenčín Region of Slovakia:

Chvojnica, Myjava District
Chvojnica, Prievidza District
Chvojnica (river)